Lyndon is a census-designated place (CDP) in the town of Lyndon, Caledonia County, Vermont, United States, corresponding to the unincorporated village originally known as Lyndon Corner. The community was first listed as a CDP prior to the 2020 census, at which it had a population of 203.

The village is in northern Caledonia County, in the southern part of the town of Lyndon. It occupies the valley of the South Wheelock Branch, an east-flowing tributary of the Passumpsic River and part of the Connecticut River watershed. U.S. Route 5 (Memorial Drive) passes through the east side of the village, and Interstate 91 forms the CDP's eastern edge. The two highways intersect at I-91's Exit 23 at the northeast corner of the village. US-5 leads north across the Passumpsic River  into Lyndonville, the largest village in the town of Lyndon, and south  to St. Johnsbury, while I-91 leads north  to Newport and south past St. Johnsbury  to White River Junction.

References 

Populated places in Caledonia County, Vermont
Census-designated places in Caledonia County, Vermont
Census-designated places in Vermont